The instrumental temperature record is a record of temperatures within Earth's climate based on direct, instrument-based measurements of air temperature and ocean temperature. Instrumental temperature records are distinguished from indirect reconstructions using climate proxy data such as from tree rings and ocean sediments. Instrument-based data are collected from thousands of meteorological stations, buoys and ships around the globe. Whilst many heavily-populated areas have a high density of measurements, observations are more widely spread in sparsely populated areas such as polar regions and deserts, as well as over many parts of Africa and South America. Measurements were historically made using mercury or alcohol thermometers which were read manually, but are increasingly made using electronic sensors which transmit data automatically. The longest-running temperature record is the Central England temperature data series, which starts in 1659. The longest-running quasi-global records start in 1850.

Temperatures are also measured in the upper atmosphere using a variety of methods, including radiosondes launched using weather balloons, a variety of satellites, and aircraft. Satellites are used extensively to monitor temperatures in the upper atmosphere but to date have generally not been used to assess temperature change at the surface. In recent decades, global surface temperature datasets have been supplemented by extensive sampling of ocean temperatures at various depths, allowing estimates of ocean heat content.

The record shows a rising trend in global average surface temperatures (i.e. global warming) driven by human-induced emissions of greenhouse gases. The global average and combined land and ocean surface temperature show a warming of 1.09 °C (range: 0.95 to 1.20 °C) from 1850–1900 to 2011–2020, based on multiple independently produced datasets. The trend is faster since 1970s than in any other 50-year period over at least the last 2000 years. Within this long-term upward trend, there is short-term variability because of natural internal variability (e.g. ENSO, volcanic eruption), but record highs have been occurring regularly.

Methods 
Instrumental temperature records are  based on direct, instrument-based measurements of air temperature and ocean temperature, unlike indirect reconstructions using climate proxy data such as from tree rings and ocean sediments. The longest-running temperature record is the Central England temperature data series, which starts in 1659. The longest-running quasi-global records start in 1850. Temperatures on other time scales are explained in global temperature record.

"Global temperature" can have different definitions. There is a small difference between air and surface temperatures.

Global record from 1850 

The period for which reasonably reliable instrumental records of near-surface temperature exist with quasi-global coverage is generally considered to begin around 1850. Earlier records exist, but with sparser coverage, largely confined to the Northern Hemisphere, and less standardized instrumentation.

The temperature data for the record come from measurements from land stations and ships. On land, temperatures are measured either using electronic sensors, or mercury or alcohol thermometers which are read manually, with the instruments being sheltered from direct sunlight using a shelter such as a Stevenson screen. The sea record consists of ships taking sea temperature measurements, mostly from hull-mounted sensors, engine inlets or buckets, and more recently includes measurements from moored and drifting buoys. The land and marine records can be compared. 

Land and sea measurement and instrument calibration is the responsibility of national meteorological services. Standardization of methods is organized through the World Meteorological Organization (and formerly through its predecessor, the International Meteorological Organization).

Most meteorological observations are taken for use in weather forecasts. Centers such as European Centre for Medium-Range Weather Forecasts show instantaneous map of their coverage; or the Hadley Centre show the coverage for the average of the year 2000. Coverage for earlier in the 20th and 19th centuries would be significantly less. While temperature changes vary both in size and direction from one location to another, the numbers from different locations are combined to produce an estimate of a global average change.

Absolute temperatures v. anomalies 

Records of global average surface temperature are usually presented as anomalies rather than as absolute temperatures. A temperature anomaly is measured against a reference value or long-term average. For example, if the reference value is 15 °C, and the measured temperature is 17 °C, then the temperature anomaly is +2 °C (i.e., 17 °C −15 °C).

Temperature anomalies are useful for deriving average surface temperatures because they tend to be highly correlated over large distances (of the order of 1000 km). In other words, anomalies are representative of temperature changes over large areas and distances. By comparison, absolute temperatures vary markedly over even short distances. A dataset based on anomalies will also be less sensitive to changes in the observing network (such as a new station opening in a particularly hot or cold location) than one based on absolute values will be.

The Earth's average surface absolute temperature for the 1961–1990 period has been derived by spatial interpolation of average observed near-surface air temperatures from over the land, oceans and sea ice regions, with a best estimate of 14 °C (57.2 °F). The estimate is uncertain, but probably lies within 0.5 °C of the true value. Given the difference in uncertainties between this absolute value and any annual anomaly, it's not valid to add them together to imply a precise absolute value for a specific year.

Total warming and trends 

The global average and combined land and ocean surface temperature, show a warming of 1.09 °C (range: 0.95 to 1.20 °C) from 1850–1900 to 2011–2020, based on multiple independently produced datasets. The trend is faster since 1970s than in any other 50-year period over at least the last 2000 years.

Most of the observed warming occurred in two periods: around 1900 to around 1940 and around 1970 onwards; the cooling/plateau from 1940 to 1970 has been mostly attributed to sulphate aerosol. Some of the temperature variations over this time period may also be due to ocean circulation patterns.

Land air temperatures are rising faster than sea surface temperatures. Land temperatures have warmed by 1.59 °C (range: 1.34 to 1.83 °C) from 1850–1900 to 2011–2020, while sea surface temperatures have warmed by 0.88 °C (range: 0.68 to 1.01 °C) over the same period.

For 1980 to 2020, the linear warming trend for combined land and sea temperatures has been 0.18 °C to 0.20 °C per decade, depending on the data set used.

It is unlikely that any uncorrected effects from urbanisation, or changes in land use or land cover, have raised global land temperature changes by more than 10%. However, larger urbanisation signals have been found locally in some rapidly urbanising regions, such as eastern China.

Warmest periods

Warmest years

The warmest years in the instrumental temperature record have occurred in the last decade (i.e. 2012-2021). The World Meteorological Organization reported in March 2021 that 2016 and 2020 were the two warmest years in the period since 1850. 

Each individual year from 2015 onwards has been warmer than any year prior to 1850. In other words: each of the seven years in 2015-2021 was clearly warmer than any pre-2014 year.  

There is a long-term warming trend, and there is variability about this trend because of natural sources of variability (e.g. ENSO such as 2014–2016 El Niño event, volcanic eruption). Not every year will set a record but record highs are occurring regularly.

While record-breaking years can attract considerable public interest, individual years are less significant than the overall trend. Some climatologists have criticized the attention that the popular press gives to "warmest year" statistics.

Based on the NOAA dataset (note that other datasets produce different rankings), the following table lists the global combined land and ocean annually averaged temperature rank and anomaly for each of the 10 warmest years on record. For comparison: IPCC uses the mean of four different datasets and expresses the data relative to 1850–1900. Although global instrumental temperature records begin only in 1850, reconstructions of earlier temperatures based on climate proxies, suggest these recent years may be the warmest for several centuries to millennia, or longer.

Warmest decades 

Numerous drivers have been found to influence annual global mean temperatures. An examination of the average global temperature changes by decades reveals continuing climate change: each of the last four decades has been successively warmer at the Earth's surface than any preceding decade since 1850. The most recent decade (2011-2020) was warmer than any multi-centennial period in the past 11,700 years.

The following chart is from NASA data of combined land-surface air and sea-surface water temperature anomalies.

Factors influencing global temperature

Factors that influence global temperature include:

 Greenhouse gases trap outgoing radiation warming the atmosphere which in turn warms the land (greenhouse effect).
 El Niño–Southern Oscillation (ENSO): El Niño generally tends to increase global temperatures. La Niña, on the other hand, usually causes years which are cooler than the short-term average. El Niño is the warm phase of the El Niño–Southern Oscillation (ENSO) and La Niña the cold phase. In the absence of other short-term influences such as volcanic eruptions, strong El Niño years are typically 0.1 °C to 0.2 °C warmer than the years immediately preceding and following them, and strong La Niña years 0.1 °C to 0.2 °C cooler. The signal is most prominent in the year in which the El Niño/La Niña ends.
 Aerosols and volcanic eruptions: Aerosols diffuse incoming radiation generally cooling the planet. On a long-term basis, aerosols are primarily of anthropogenic origin, but major volcanic eruptions can produce quantities of aerosols which exceed those from anthropogenic sources over periods of time up to a few years. Volcanic eruptions which are sufficiently large to inject significant quantities of sulphur dioxide into the stratosphere can have a significant global cooling effect for one to three years after the eruption. This effect is most prominent for tropical volcanoes as the resultant aerosols can spread over both hemispheres. The largest eruptions of the last 100 years, such as the Mount Pinatubo eruption in 1991 and Mount Agung eruption in 1963-1964, have been followed by years with global mean temperatures 0.1 °C to 0.2 °C below long-term trends at the time.
 Land use change like deforestation can increase greenhouse gases through burning biomass. Albedo can also be changed.
 Incoming solar radiation varies very slightly, with the main variation controlled by the approximately 11-year solar magnetic activity cycle.

Robustness of evidence
There is a scientific consensus that climate is changing and that greenhouse gases emitted by human activities are the primary driver. The scientific consensus is reflected, for example, by the Intergovernmental Panel on Climate Change (IPCC), an international body which summarizes existing science, and the U.S. Global Change Research Program.

The methods used to derive the principal estimates of global surface temperature trends—HadCRUT3, NOAA and NASA/GISS—are largely independent.

Other reports and assessments

The U.S. National Academy of Sciences, both in its 2002 report to President George W. Bush, and in later publications, has strongly endorsed evidence of an average global temperature increase in the 20th century.

The preliminary results of an assessment carried out by the Berkeley Earth Surface Temperature group and made public in October 2011, found that over the past 50 years the land surface warmed by 0.911 °C, and their results mirrors those obtained from earlier studies carried out by the NOAA, the Hadley Centre and NASA's GISS. The study addressed concerns raised by "skeptics" including urban heat island effect, "poor" station quality, and the "issue of data selection bias" and found that these effects did not bias the results obtained from these earlier studies.

The Berkeley Earth dataset has subsequently been made operational and is now one of the datasets used by IPCC and WMO in their assessments.

Global surface and ocean datasets 

National Oceanic and Atmospheric Administration (NOAA) maintains the Global Historical Climatology Network (GHCN-Monthly) data base containing historical temperature, precipitation, and pressure data for thousands of land stations worldwide. Also, NOAA's National Climatic Data Center (NCDC) of surface temperature measurements maintains a global temperature record since 1880.

HadCRUT, a collaboration between the University of East Anglia's Climatic Research Unit and the Hadley Centre for Climate Prediction and Research

NASA's Goddard Institute for Space Studies maintains GISTEMP.

More recently the Berkeley Earth Surface Temperature dataset. These datasets are updated frequently, and are generally in close agreement.

Internal climate variability and global warming 

One of the issues that has been raised in the media is the view that global warming "stopped in 1998".
This view ignores the presence of internal climate variability. Internal climate variability is a result of complex interactions between components of the climate system, such as the coupling between the atmosphere and ocean. An example of internal climate variability is the El Niño–Southern Oscillation (ENSO). The El Niño in 1998 was particularly strong, possibly one of the strongest of the 20th century, and 1998 was at the time the world's warmest year on record by a substantial margin.

Cooling over the 2007 to 2012 period, for instance, was likely driven by internal modes of climate variability such as La Niña. The area of cooler-than-average sea surface temperatures that defines La Niña conditions can push global temperatures downward, if the phenomenon is strong enough. The slowdown in global warming rates over the 1998 to 2012 period is also less pronounced in current generations of observational datasets than in those available at the time in 2012. The temporary slowing of warming rates ended after 2012, with every year from 2015 onwards warmer than any year prior to 2015, but it is expected that warming rates will continue to fluctuate on decadal timescales through the 21st century.

Satellite temperature records

The most recent climate model simulations give a range of results for changes in global-average temperature. Some models show more warming in the troposphere than at the surface, while a slightly smaller number of simulations show the opposite behaviour. There is no fundamental inconsistency among these model results and observations at the global scale.

The satellite records used to show much smaller warming trends for the troposphere which were considered to disagree with model prediction; however, following revisions to the satellite records, the trends are now similar.

Siting of temperature measurement stations 
The U.S. National Weather Service Cooperative Observer Program has established minimum standards regarding the instrumentation, siting, and reporting of surface temperature stations. The observing systems available are able to detect year-to-year temperature variations such as those caused by El Niño or volcanic eruptions.

Another study concluded in 2006, that existing empirical techniques for validating the local and regional consistency of temperature data are adequate to identify and remove biases from station records, and that such corrections allow information about long-term trends to be preserved. A study in 2013 also found that urban bias can be accounted for, and when all available station data is divided into rural and urban, that both temperature sets are broadly consistent.

Related research

Trends and predictions 

Each of the seven years in 2015-2021 was clearly warmer than any pre-2014 year, and this trend is expected to be true for some time to come (that is, the 2016 record will be broken before 2026 etc.). A decadal forecast by the World Meteorological Organisation issued in 2021 stated a probability of 40% of having a year above 1.5 C in the 2021-2025 period.

Global warming is very likely to reach 1.0 °C to 1.8 °C by the late 21st century under the very low GHG emissions scenario. In an intermediate scenario global warming would reach 2.1 °C to 3.5 °C, and 3.3 °C to 5.7 °C under the very high GHG emissions scenario. These projections are based on climate models in combination with observations.

Regional temperature changes 

The changes in climate are not expected to be uniform across the Earth. In particular, land areas change more quickly than oceans, and northern high latitudes change more quickly than the tropics. There are three major ways in which global warming will make changes to regional climate: melting ice, changing the hydrological cycle (of evaporation and precipitation) and changing currents in the oceans.

See also

 Atmospheric reanalysis
 Carbon dioxide in Earth's atmosphere
 Heat wave
 
 
 Temperature record of the last 2,000 years
 Warming stripes

References

External links 
GISS Surface Temperature Analysis (GISTEMP)
Google Earth interface for CRUTEM4 land temperature data
International Surface Temperature Initiative

Historical climatology
Articles containing video clips